Fronsac is a commune in the Haute-Garonne department in southwestern France.

It is situated on the former Route nationale 618, the "Route of the Pyrenees".

Population

See also
Communes of the Haute-Garonne department

References

Communes of Haute-Garonne
Haute-Garonne communes articles needing translation from French Wikipedia